Ehya or Vigil night (that is, spending the night in prayer and worship) is one of the most important traditions among Shia Muslims. According to most commentators, vigil for the purpose of night prayer, as it appears from Surah Al-Muzzammil of Quran (holy book of Islam), was obligatory for about a year at the beginning of Islam (according to the differences in the narrations), and Muslims performed it alongside the Islamic prophet, Muhammad. According to most Islamic jurists and commentators, after about a year, according to verse 21 of the same surah, God reduced this ruling and replaced it with tahajjud. Muslims do Ehya or Vigil night on the nineteenth, twenty-first and twenty-third nights of the Islamic month of Ramadan.

Ehya in a special sense
Ehya in a special term means staying awake and vigil on certain nights of the year, the most important of which is Laylat al-Qadr (the nineteenth, twenty-first and twenty-third nights of Islamic month of Ramadan). Also, in a narration of Ali (first Imam of Shia), it is recommended to vigil four nights, i.e. the first night of the Islamic month of Rajab, the night of Mid-Sha'ban, the night of Eid al-Fitr and the night of Eid al-Adha.

It has been narrated from Muhammad that whoever keeps the nights of Eids (Eid al-Fitr and Eid al-Adha) vigil, his/her heart will survive on the day when hearts die. A similar narration has been included about vigiling on the night of Mid-Sha'ban.

Specifications
Ehya is a ritual that can be held individually or collectively. One can do Ehya oneself at home or join with a group in mosque. Ehya can be done on all nights of the year, but certain nights are more recommended by religious leaders. Ehya can be accomplished simply by staying awake during the night and reciting dhikr or praying at night. It is also possible to use the more specialized prayers and traditions mentioned in the book Mafatih al-Janan for Ehya.

Rewards
It has been mentioned in many narrations of Muhammad and The Fourteen Infallibles that whoever vigiling the nights of Qadr, his/her sins will be forgiven. It is also said His/her livelihood has increased and he/she sees openness in his works. According to the text of the hadith of the Imams, staying awake for part of the night and praying and reciting the Qur'an is very spiritual rewarding in Islam. Other attributes are also mentioned in Islamic texts, including: with Ehya, the disease leaves the body. Makes a person's face bright and beautiful. Makes the house and the place where the Ehya took place illuminated. It causes continuous and long efforts in the day. Guarantee of a hassle-free day. It is an opportunity to relax the nerves and relieve fatigue, depression and irritation of body and soul. An opportunity for pray with the Creator of the universe and the culmination of nearness to God. It builds and strengthens the spirit and transfers power to individual from the source of science and power. It improves the relations between people.

See also
 19 Ramadan
 21 Ramadan
 23 Ramadan

References

Shia Islam
Islamic terminology